Michiji Tajima (July 2, 1885 – December 2, 1968) was a Japanese businessman and educator. He was Grand Steward of the Imperial Household Office (June 5, 1948 – May 31, 1949) and continued as Grand Steward of the its successor, the Imperial Household Agency (June 1, 1949 – December 16, 1953). He graduated from the University of Tokyo.

Bibliography
 『孔子 その人とその伝説』　H．G．クリール　田島道治訳　岩波書店、1993年10月7日(第６刷)、
 著者(H.G.Creel、1905-94年)は、シカゴ大学教授、初版は1961年1月31日、数度復刊された。のち、2014年9月10日より、同出版社より、オンデマンド版()を発行。  
 『田島道治　昭和に「奉公」した生涯』　加藤恭子著 TBSブリタニカ、2002年、
 『昭和天皇　「謝罪詔勅草稿」の発見』 加藤恭子著 文藝春秋、2003年、
 『昭和天皇と田島道治と吉田茂』 加藤恭子著 人文書館、2006年、

External links
 文藝春秋｜本の話より｜自著を語る

20th-century Japanese businesspeople
Japanese educators
Sony people
University of Tokyo alumni
People from Nagoya
1885 births
1968 deaths